Ibrahim Gusau is a Nigerian politician and former minister for Agriculture and Industries.

Early life and education
Gusau was born on 25th January 1945 in Sokoto, Sokoto State. Ibrahim Gusau started his elementary education at the Gusua Elementary School. He then transferred to Sokoto Central Elementary School before finishing his secondary education at Sokoto Middle School. He enrolled in Clerical Training College at Ahmadu Bello University in Zaria after completing his secondary education.

Career
Ibrahim Gusau worked for the Sokoto Native Authority as a clerical officer from 1944 to 1946, a senior accountant from 1946 to 1948, a chief accountant from 1948 to 1950, the supervisor-in-chief of adult education, public enlightenment, and community development from 1951 to 1960, an assistant chief scribe from 1960 to 1963, and the registrar of Sultan's Court from 1963 to 1964. State Minister for Agriculture from 1964 until 1966.

Politics
He contested the primaries of the Gubernatorial seat of the National Party of Nigeria (NPN) in 1983 but lost to the incumbent Garba Nadama. He is also a member of the Sokoto Sultanate council with the title of Sarkin Malamai and was a member of the 1977 and 1995 constitutional assemblies. He was the National Chairman of the United Nigeria Congress (UNC) which merged with the United Nigeria Party (UNP) and Solidarity Group of Nigeria (SGN) led by Umaru Dikko to form the United Nigeria Congress Party (UNCP) during the Sani Abacha transition program.

References

https://web.archive.org/web/20070501024829/http://www.ngex.com/nigeria/govt/constitution/con1995.htm

Living people
Year of birth missing (living people)
Place of birth missing (living people)